Ian Richard Hamilton (born 14 December 1967) is an English former professional footballer who played in the Football League as a midfielder between 1988 and 2002. Hamilton spent four years with Scunthorpe United and six with West Bromwich Albion as well as having shorter spells with Southampton, Cambridge United, Sheffield United, Grimsby Town, Notts County, Lincoln City and Woking.

Career
Stevenage-born Hamilton started his career off with Southampton, joining "The Saints" as an associate schoolboy in January 1982. He signed as an apprentice in July 1984, before signing his first professional contract on his 18th birthday in December 1985. He remained at The Dell for a further two years, playing in the reserves but failing to break into the first team, before a free transfer to Cambridge United in March 1988. He remained with the club until December of that year when he made a move to Scunthorpe United on a free transfer.

He spent the next four years playing for "The Iron", and eventually his performances earned him a move to West Bromwich Albion in 1992 for £160,000. While with "The Baggies", Hamilton played under manager Alan Buckley.

In 1998 Albion sold Hamilton to Sheffield United for £325,000 and he would remain at Bramall Lane for the next two seasons. While at United, he was re-signed by Alan Buckley at fellow First division side Grimsby Town. Hamilton played six times for "The Mariners", scoring once in his one-month loan spell.

At the end of the 1999–00 campaign, following his release from United, Hamilton signed for Notts County on a two-year deal. However, in November 2001 he was signed by Buckley for a third time, this time at Lincoln City. He scored his first and what turned out to be only goal for Lincoln against Leyton Orient in the FA Cup. He was part of the squad that was nearly relegated out of the Football League. With the club in financial difficulties, and Hamilton not being part of new manager Keith Alexander's plans, he agreed a severance package in October 2002, and played out the 2002–03 campaign for Conference side Woking before retiring at the end of the season.

Personal life
After retirement as a footballer he worked as an IT business development manager.

References

External links

Profile at The Forgotten Imp

Living people
1967 births
People from Stevenage
English footballers
Southampton F.C. players
Cambridge United F.C. players
Scunthorpe United F.C. players
West Bromwich Albion F.C. players
Sheffield United F.C. players
Grimsby Town F.C. players
Notts County F.C. players
Lincoln City F.C. players
Woking F.C. players
English Football League players
National League (English football) players
Association football midfielders